Chapleau  was a federal electoral district in Quebec, Canada, that was represented in the House of Commons of Canada from 1935 to 1968. It is currently a Quebec provincial riding that includes the majority of the Gatineau region.

This riding was created in 1933 from parts of Berthier—Maskinongé, Champlain, Joliette, L'Assomption—Montcalm, Pontiac, and Three Rivers and St. Maurice ridings.

It was abolished in 1967 when it was redistributed into Abitibi, Berthier, Champlain, Portneuf and Villeneuve ridings.

A different Chapleau riding existed from 1987-1988 in a different part of Quebec. It was renamed in 1988 to Gatineau—La Lièvre.

History
It consisted of:

 the towns of Buckingham, Gatineau, Masson and Thurso;
 in the County of Labelle: the Municipality of Notre-Dame-du-Laus;
 in the County of Papineau: the township municipalities of Lochaber and  Lochaber-Partie-Ouest; the united townships municipality of Mulgrave-et-Derry; the municipalities of Ange-Gardien, Bowman, Mayo, Notre-Dame-de-la-Salette, Saint-Sixte, Val-des-Bois et Val-des-Monts.

Members of Parliament

This riding elected the following Members of Parliament:

Election results

|Ouvrier canadien
|Jean-Jacques Rouleau
|align=right|243

See also 
 List of Canadian federal electoral districts
 Past Canadian electoral districts

External links
Riding history from the Library of Parliament

Former federal electoral districts of Quebec